Peralvillo is a municipality (municipio) of the Monte Plata province in the Dominican Republic. It is also known as Esperalvillo.

References 

Municipalities of the Dominican Republic
Populated places in Monte Plata Province